Gheorghe Țarălungă (born 11 February 1941) is a Romanian wrestler. He competed in the men's freestyle flyweight at the 1964 Summer Olympics.

References

1941 births
Living people
Romanian male sport wrestlers
Olympic wrestlers of Romania
Wrestlers at the 1964 Summer Olympics
Place of birth missing (living people)